Jack Kenna (born 1932) was a Gaelic footballer from County Laois. He was born in Kilmullen.

He played for many years on the Laois senior football team in the forwards and was widely regarded as one of the outstanding players in Ireland of the 1950s. He also played for his province Leinster, winning three Railway Cup medals in 1955, 1959 and 1961.

Kenna began his football career with the Jamestown club. From 1951 onwards, he played for the O'Dempseys club and retired in 1962, the year before the club won its first Laois Senior Football Championship title. When he retired in 1962, he was Laois' top-scoring NFL player at that time, with (7-107) 128pts.

Further reading
 O'Dwyer, Joe; Sport in Port, 2001

References

1932 births
Living people
Laois inter-county Gaelic footballers
Jamestown Gaelic footballers
O'Dempseys Gaelic footballers